Vincenzo Santoruvo (born 8 June 1978) is a former Italian professional footballer. He played as a striker.

References

External links
Profile at legaserieb.it

1978 births
Living people
People from Bitonto
Italian footballers
Association football forwards
S.S. Fidelis Andria 1928 players
S.S.C. Bari players
Frosinone Calcio players
Footballers from Apulia
Sportspeople from the Metropolitan City of Bari